Jens Truckenbrod (born 18 February 1980 in Singen) is a semi-retired German footballer who plays as midfielder. He currently serves as manager for amateur side Concordia Albachten.

References

External links
 

1980 births
Living people
People from Singen
Sportspeople from Freiburg (region)
German footballers
Germany youth international footballers
Borussia Mönchengladbach II players
Sportfreunde Siegen players
FC Schaffhausen players
Dynamo Dresden players
FC Carl Zeiss Jena players
SC Preußen Münster players
3. Liga players
Association football midfielders
Footballers from Baden-Württemberg